Journal for Plague Lovers is the ninth studio album by Welsh alternative rock band Manic Street Preachers, released on 18 May 2009 by record label Columbia. Recorded between October 2008 and February 2009 and produced by Steve Albini and Dave Eringa, it features exclusively posthumously published lyrics by Richey Edwards, who disappeared on 1 February 1995 and was presumed deceased in 2008. It is the only Manic Street Preachers album in which the lyrics for every song were written solely by Edwards.

The album received critical acclaim upon release and debuted at number 3 in the UK Albums Chart.

Music and lyrics 

The Manics posted the following message on their official website:

All thirteen songs on the new record feature lyrics left to us by Richey. The brilliance and intelligence of the lyrics dictated that we had to finally use them. Topics include The Grande Odalisque by Ingres, Marlon Brando, Giant Haystacks, celebrity, consumerism and dysmorphia; all reiterating the genius and intellect of Richard James Edwards.

Wire, the band's de facto lyricist, had begun contributing musically to the songwriting process on the album, stating "I did write quite a bit of music. [...] I wrote all of 'William's Last Words', I wrote pretty much all of 'Marlon JD', I wrote the chorus for 'Peeled Apples', the verse for 'She Bathed Herself in a Bath of Bleach'". The lyrics are taken from a folder of songs, haikus, collages and drawings Edwards gave to bassist-lyricist Nicky Wire a few weeks before he disappeared. Edwards also gave photocopies of the folder to singer-guitarist James Dean Bradfield and drummer Sean Moore. The band have described the Rymans folder as having a picture of Bugs Bunny drawn on the front emblazoned with the word 'opulence' in capital letters. In promotional interviews for the album, Bradfield and Wire have revealed that the folder contains around twenty-eight songs. Four of these appeared on the 1996 album Everything Must Go: "Elvis Impersonator: Blackpool Pier", "Kevin Carter", "Removables" and "Small Black Flowers that Grow in the Sky". Of the rest of the folder, Wire stated:

There's probably between eight and ten maybe that were too impossible. Some of them are little haikus, four lines. "Dolphin-Friendly Tuna Wars", that's one; "Alien Orders/Invisible Armies", that's one [the band have recorded an instrumental that takes its title from this lyric]; "Young Men", which is quite Joy Division. They just didn't feel right. We'll probably put them all out in a book one day. There's not gonna be a Journal for Plague Lovers Two. The special version of the record does come with the original version of the tracks on there. So you can see the editing process, if there is any.

The album was released with a Deluxe edition that included pages from Richey's journal. The table of contents page for Richey's journal is reproduced within the liner notes. Eighteen of the twenty-eight listings there, however, are removed using black felt-tip. There are only a limited number of pages from the journal that are reproduced in the liner notes.

Several tracks refer to Edwards' time in a couple of hospitals in 1994. Among them is "She Bathed Herself in a Bath of Bleach", of which James Dean Bradfield said to the NME: "There're some people he met when he was in one of the two places having treatment and I think he just digested other people's stories and experiences." The final track, "William's Last Words", has been compared to a suicide note, and although Nicky Wire rejects this suggestion Bradfield observes, "you can draw some pretty obvious conclusions from the lyrics." Wire, who admitted finding the task of editing this song "pretty choking", eventually composed the music and sang lead vocals after Bradfield found himself unsuited to the task. The album features several cultural references, including a passage from the film The Machinist, which features in the song "Peeled Apples" and a passage taken from the film The Virgin Suicides, which features in the song "Doors Closing Slowly".

Bradfield commented that Journal for Plague Lovers was an attempt to finally secure the legacy of their former member Richey Edwards and the result was that, during the recording process, it was as close to feeling his presence since his disappearance: "There was a sense of responsibility to do his words justice. That was part of the whole thing of letting enough time lapse. Once we actually got into the studio, it almost felt as if we were a full band; it [was] as close to him being in the room again as possible."

Stylistically, the album features a post-punk and alternative rock sound reminiscent of The Holy Bible. Cam Lindsay of Exclaim! proclaimed the record to be a "relentlessly exploratory piece of art rock".

The album's opening track "Peeled Apples" was played for the first time on Zane Lowe's BBC Radio 1 show on 25 March 2009. During an interview with Lowe, Wire said there would be no singles released from the album. "Jackie Collins Existential Question Time" was aired on XFM and Kerrang! Radio on 30 March. It was also embedded on the band's official website.

In 2020, an in-depth analysis of Edwards' lyrics on the album, by Guy Mankowski (with input from Edwards' sister, Rachel) was published in the journal 'Punk & Post-Punk'. Mankowski concluded that 'in Edwards' lyrics, a number of metaphors reconfigure the malleability of the physical body and expand the concept of how self-fashioning can be applied in relation to it'.

Release 

The album was released on 18 May 2009 on CD, a two-disc CD edition, download and LP. The album entered the UK Album Chart at number 3, selling 34,707 copies in the first week. It charted within the Top 20 in Ireland and in Norway. So far the album has been certified Silver in the UK.

A Deluxe Edition CD was released, includes a second disc with demo versions of all thirteen album songs and a hardback 36-page booklet featuring Edwards' original lyrics and artwork. These lyrics, in the process of adaptation to the album, had often been substantially edited and rearranged. This version of the album is missing the hidden track "Bag Lady", whose lyrics are however not included on the single disc edition. The Japanese edition of the album was released on 13 May 2009, and features two exclusive bonus tracks. The download version includes a bonus remix by the NYPC and an acoustic version of the title track.

Cover art controversy 
The album cover art uses an original painting, Stare (2005), by Jenny Saville, who also contributed artwork for The Holy Bible. The top four UK supermarkets stocked the CD in a plain slipcase, after the cover was deemed "inappropriate" due to the belief that the red on the boy's face was blood. Bradfield said the decision was "utterly bizarre", and commented:

The album cover art placed second in a 2009 poll for Best Art Vinyl.

Reception 

Contrary to worries on the part of Nicky Wire that Journal for Plague Lovers "could seriously damage" the band, and in spite of initial suspicions that the album constituted "a blatant attempt to recapture the glory days of an album [they] released 15 years ago", reviews were ultimately highly favourable. At Metacritic, which assigns a normalized rating out of 100 to reviews from mainstream critics, the album received an average score of 85 out of 100 based on eighteen reviews, which indicates "universal acclaim".

Journal for Plague Lovers scored a rare five-star review in Q magazine, which argued that by "breathing life into Richey Edwards's own last words", the band "crafted not a memorial but a celebration". Retrospectively, the publication named the album the fifth best record of 2009, declaring it one of the band's "finest and most heartfelt moments". John Doran from NME awarded the record an 8/10 grade, arguing that Journal for Plague Lovers should not be burdened with expectations of becoming "The Holy Bible Mark II" but was simply "an outstanding album in its own right". The magazine named the album the 14th best of the year. Uncut, meanwhile, argued that the record brought a "sense of closure" to the legacy of Richey Edwards, describing it as a "brave, compelling record that stands shoulder to shoulder with the Manics' best", and the twenty-third best album of 2009.

Response from news publications was mostly positive, with Caroline Sullivan of The Guardian describing it as "a passionate rock album that honours the past yet is very much of the present", and Simon Price of The Independent declared Journal for Plague Lovers "the album of 2009 – hands down, no contest". David Cheal of The Daily Telegraph was critical, however, accusing them of being "a plodding indie-rock trio whose ambition has consistently outstripped their ability" and giving the record only two stars out of five. Elsewhere, Journal for Plague Lovers earned recognition as a return to form begun on previous album Send Away the Tigers; for example, from Pitchforks Joe Tangari, who summarized the album thus: "Even if it were the desperate or cynical move some people have claimed it is, there's no denying that purging Edwards' old lyric folder has helped the band create its best album in a decade. Quite simply, they haven't sounded so focused or so purposeful in a long, long time, and they are at their best with a sense of purpose underpinning their music." Likewise, Stephen Thomas Erlewine of AllMusic remarked that "they were making inroads in this direction on 2007's Send Away the Tigers – for tight, clanking, cantankerous guitars" and commended the album for its sense of hope: "Journal for Plague Lovers winds up being The Holy Bible in reverse: every moment of despair is a reason to keep on living instead of an excuse to pack it all in."

Accolades 

Journal for Plague Lovers was placed at number 10 on Metacritic's list of the fifty best-reviewed albums of 2009, and was placed on numerous critics' ranking lists for the year, particularly from British music magazines:

 On 15 December it was chosen as one of AllMusic's favourite albums of 2009.
 UK music website Drowned in Sound placed Journal for Plague Lovers at number 4 in their list of the fifty best albums of 2009.
 The Guardian newspaper selected Journal for Plague Lovers at number 11 in their critics' poll for 2009.
 Mojo placed the album at number 20 in their list of the fifty best albums of 2009.
 Journal for Plague Lovers made number 14 in NME's list of the fifty best albums of 2009.
 Q placed the record at number 5 in their list of the fifty best albums of 2009.
 Another British music website, The Quietus, chose the album as the fifth best of 2009.
 Journal for Plague Lovers placed at 23 in Uncut's list of the fifty best albums of 2009.

Track listing

Personnel 

 Manic Street Preachers

 James Dean Bradfield – lead vocals, lead and rhythm guitar
 Sean Moore – drums, percussion
 Nicky Wire – bass guitar, backing vocals, lead vocals on "William's Last Words", piano on "Virginia State Epileptic Colony"

 Additional personnel

 Andy Walters – string arrangement, strings
 Katherine Thomas – harp
 Joanna Parkhurst – strings
 Bernard Kane – strings
 Nathan Stone – strings

 Technical personnel

 Steve Albini – recording (tracks 1–3, 6, 7, 9–11 and 13), mixing ("William's Last Words")
 Dave Eringa – mixing (all tracks except "William's Last Words"), recording (tracks 4, 5 and 8), production (tracks 2, 4, 5, 8 and 12)
 Loz Williams – recording (tracks 1, 5, 6 and 11–13), recording and engineering of original demos
 Steve Davis – recording ("Marlon J.D.")
 Greg Norman – engineering
 Ben Cunningham – engineering assistance
 Jenny Saville – front cover artwork
 Steve Stacey – sleeve design
 Mitch Ikeda – sleeve photography

Charts and certifications

Certifications

Remixes EP 

Tracks from Journal for Plague Lovers have been remixed by a number of artists, and the Journal for Plague Lovers Remixes EP was released on 15 June 2009. Martin Noble of the band British Sea Power remixed the song "Me and Stephen Hawking"; Andrew Weatherall remixed "Peeled Apples", which he has described as "sounding like Charlie Watts playing with PiL"; The Horrors remixed "Doors Closing Slowly"; NYPC remixed the song "Marlon J.D" and the EP also features remixes by Patrick Wolf, Underworld, Four Tet, Errors, Adem, Optimo and Fuck Buttons.

Track listing

References

External links 

Journal for Plague Lovers at YouTube (streamed copy where licensed)
 

2009 albums
Albums produced by Steve Albini
Columbia Records albums
Manic Street Preachers albums
Albums produced by Dave Eringa
Albums recorded at Rockfield Studios
Art rock albums by Welsh artists
Post-punk albums by Welsh artists